FIFA Young Player Award may refer to:

 FIFA World Cup Young Player Award, FIFA World Cup for best young player of tournament
 FIFA Women's World Cup Young Player Award, FIFA Women's World Cup for best young player of tournament